Bengt af Kleen (March 26, 1922 – April 2, 2003) was a Swedish curler.

In 1967 he was inducted into the Swedish Curling Hall of Fame.

Teams

References

External links
 

1922 births
2003 deaths
Swedish male curlers
Swedish curling champions
20th-century Swedish people